Sheri Lynn Bueter Hauser (born July 2, 1975) is an American former soccer player who played as a forward, making one appearance for the United States women's national team.

Career
Bueter Hauser played her youth career with Hammer FC, currently known as Kings Hammer, under coach Clay Revis.  In 1993 Bueter Hauser won the US Youth Soccer National Championship in Phoenix Arizona with Hammer FC. Bueter Hauser was a member of the State an Regional ODP team throughout her youth career and a pool player for the ODP National Team.

Bueter Hauser played for the Fairfield Indians in high school.

In college, she played for the Clemson Tigers in 1994 and 1996 to 1998, where she was a letter-winner. She missed the 1995 season due to a knee injury. In total, she scored 26 goals and recorded 40 assists in 88 appearances for the Tigers, making her the school's all-time assist leader. She was included in the ACC First Team selection in 1998, and Second Team in 1994 and 1997. She was also included in the All-ACC Tournament Team in 1996, 1997, and 1998. She was named All- American in 1999 alongside two fellow Tigers.

Bueter Hauser made her only international appearance for the United States on December 16, 1998 in a friendly match against Ukraine, coming on as a substitute for Susan Bush. She played 19 minutes, with the match finishing as a 2–1 win.

In 2001, she was inducted into the Fairfield Highschool Athletic Hall of Fame.

In 2009, she was inducted into the Clemson University Athletic Hall of Fame.

Personal life
Bueter Hauser, who resides in Cornelius, North Carolina, is married to Scott Hauser and has three children.

Career statistics

International

References

1975 births
Living people
People from Fairfield, Ohio
Soccer players from Ohio
American women's soccer players
United States women's international soccer players
Women's association football forwards
Women's association football wingers
Clemson Tigers women's soccer players